DZA may refer to:

Smoke DZA, a musician
airport code for Dzaoudzi Pamandzi International Airport, in Mayotte, near Madagascar
ISO 3166-1 alpha-3 code for Algeria
language code for the Tunzu language